The 2022 Poland Open is a sport wrestling event was held in Warsaw, Poland between 20 and 24 July 2022. 26th Poland Open in Women's Wrestling, 31st Wacław Ziolkowski Memorial in Freestyle wrestling and 65th Wladyslaw Pytlasiński Memorial in Greco – Roman.

Competition schedule
All times are (GMT+2)

Event videos
The event will air freely on the SportZona YouTube channel.

Medal table

Team ranking

Medal overview

Men's freestyle (Waclaw Ziolkowski Memorial)

Men's Greco-Roman (Wladyslaw Pytlasinski Cup)

Women's freestyle (Poland Open)

Participating nations 
386 wrestlers from 33 countries:

  (2)
  (14)
  (6)
  (2)
  (8)
  (42)
  (6)
  (3)
  (10)
  (6)
  (9)
  (15)
  (3)
  (1)
  (23)
  (5)
  (15)
  (15)
  (13)
  (4)
  (16)
  (3)
  (2)
  (2)
  (1)
  (9)
  (66) (Host)
  (13)
  (1)
  (14)
  (14)
  (30)
  (16)

References

External links 
 UWW Database
 Official cite

Poland Open
Poland Open
International wrestling competitions hosted by Poland
Sports competitions in Warsaw
Poland Open